Sujan R. Chinoy (born 1958) is a former Indian diplomat currently serving as the Director General of the Manohar Parrikar Institute for Defense Studies and Analyses (IDSA), India's foremost think-tank in New Delhi in the field of defence, security and international relations. The appointment followed his retirement from the Indian Foreign Service on 30 September 2018 after a professional diplomatic career spanning more than thirty-seven years with experience on China and East Asia, as well as the Asia-Pacific region, the Gulf and OIC, United Nations (Disarmament and International Security), National Security, as well as the US and the Latin American region. He held the highest rank of Grade I Ambassador (equivalent to Vice Minister/Secretary to the Government of India).

Career

Ambassador to Japan
He was Indian Ambassador to Japan from 2015-2018. He was also the Indian Ambassador to the Republic of the Marshall Islands. He facilitated the visits of Prime Minister Narendra Modi to Japan in 2016 and 2018 as well as Prime Minister Shinzo Abe's visits to India in 2015 and 2017. He contributed to the realization of the India-Japan Special Strategic and Global Partnership. Major developments took place during his tenure, including the conclusion of the Shinkansen (Bullet Train/Mumbai Ahmedabad High Speed Rail) project, the Civil Nuclear Cooperation Agreement, the Japanese vocational training centers in India (Japan India Institutes of Manufacturing or "JIMs"), the placement of young Indian professionals in Japanese companies under Japan's Technical Intern Training Programme (TITP) and areas such as healthcare, digital technologies, start-ups, agriculture, food processing, disaster risk reduction, space sciences, earth sciences, oceanography and defence cooperation.

During his term in Japan, India emerged as Japan's largest ODA partner and Japan became one of the top three investors in the Indian economy with a presence in manufacturing, financial markets, acquisitions and mergers, logistics and start ups. Japan participated on key infrastructure project in India, besides becoming linked to all the major flagship initiatives such as Smart City, Swachh Bharat (Clean India), Digital India, Start Up India, Ayushman Bharat National Health Protection Mission, etc.

Other appointments
Chinoy served as Indian Ambassador to Mexico and High Commissioner of India to Belize from 2012 to 2015. He was Additional Secretary in the National Security Council Secretariat in the Prime Minister's Office in New Delhi for several years. He also served for many years as India's Consul General in China (Shanghai) and Australia (Sydney) handling trade and economic portfolios.

Early life
Chinoy was born to Romeshchandra Chinoy, a senior Indian Police Service officer and Usha Chinoy (née Joshi), a well-known musician, social worker and educationist; taught at the Rajkumar College, Rajkot . Usha Chinoy's grandfather, Vaidya Shastri Manishankar Govindji (Maṇicaṅkar Kōvintaji), founded the Ayurveda firm Atank Nigrah Pharmacy in Jamnagar in 1881. The Atank Nigrah Pharmacy was an early multi-national company, with branches in Singapore, Penang (Malaysia), Rangoon (Burma), Colombo (Sri Lanka) and Karachi (in the then undivided India), apart from major cities in India. Chinoy's paternal grandfather, Barrister C. N. Chinoy, was a two-term Dewan (Prime Minister) of the state of Rajkot during the 1930s-1940s after whom the pre-Independence "Infantry Road" in the old Cantonment area of Rajkot was renamed "Barrister Chinoy Road". Chinoy has two sisters, Dr. Parasmani Acharya and Dr. Mala R. Chinoy.
Chinoy is a direct descendant of Seth Nanji Jekaran Shah (later Seth Nanji Chinai of Mangrol), an early Jain trader from Mangrol in coastal Saurashtra in Western India who founded the Gujarati community in Kolkata and was also the first Gujarati trader in Shanghai, and lived there for twelve years in the opening decades of the 19th century. The 200-year old Jain Derasar (Temple) in the town of Palitana in the Shatrunjay Mountain Range (in Gujarat), well known as ‘Nanji Chinai’s Chaumukhji Derasar’, was built with donations by Sujan Chinoy's ancestor Seth Nanji Jekaran Shah. This Derasar’s main Jain Tirthankar (nayak) is Chandraprabhu and it has 21 marble statues/idols and one metal statue/idol of each of the various Tirthankars of Jainism.

Education
Chinoy was educated at the Rajkumar College, Rajkot (1965–74), where he excelled in the school's orchestra (sitar) and was a member of the rifle shooting team. He did his BA (Hons.) in English Literature and Psychology and Diploma in German from the Maharaja Sayajirao University of Baroda, and, his MBA in Marketing from B.K. School of Business Management, Gujarat University, Ahmedabad. He represented his university/district in athletics, rifle-shooting, swimming and bodybuilding. He is also an accomplished rider who has pursued horse-back riding, tent-pegging and show jumping as a hobby. While at the university, Chinoy was a Senior Under Officer in the Infantry Wing of the National Cadet Corps and completed his "C" Certificate, including a special high-altitude ski course at the Indian Institute of Skiing and Mountaineering in Gulmarg. He participated in the All India Inter-University Rifle Shooting Championship held in Chennai in 1976. He was offered a direct commission in the Indian Army but preferred to pursue post-graduate studies and join the Indian Foreign Service in 1981.

He is fluent in Chinese (Mandarin) and has a degree from the Chinese University of Hong Kong. He also knows French, German, Japanese, Arabic, Spanish and French Creole, besides Gujarati, Hindi and Urdu. He was an exchange student at the Otemon Gakuin University in Osaka, Japan in 1978.

Other achievements
Chinoy organised the largest gathering of Yoga enthusiasts outside of India for the event marking the International Yoga Day on 21 May 2015 in Mexico City which witnessed about 6000 participants on the broad Reforma Avenue. He gave a sitar performance on 2 October 2013, playing Mahatma Gandhiji's favourite bhajans Raghupati Raghav Rajaram and Vaishnava Jana To, to mark Gandhi Jayanti in Mexico City. He has performed a cameo role in a Gujarati Film titled Sorath No Sinh Chelbhai. 
At the time of his retirement, he was the senior-most career Ambassador of the Indian Foreign Service overseas, as well as the country's only Gujarati Ambassador.

References

1958 births
Living people
Ambassadors of India to Japan
Ambassadors of India to Mexico
Maharaja Sayajirao University of Baroda alumni